The 2017 Merthyr Tydfil County Borough Council election took place on Thursday 4 May 2017 to elect the 33 members of Merthyr Tydfil County Borough Council in Wales. This was on the same day as other 2017 United Kingdom local elections. The Council shifted back from Labour to Independent control.

Results

|}

The outcome of the election wasn't decided until 8 June 2017, because the vote in the Cyfarthfa ward was delayed due to the death of a candidate. At the 4 May election the Independents overtook Labour as the largest group on the council, but were 1 seat short of a majority. They gained two of the three Cyfarthfa seats on June 8 to win control of the council. The former Labour leader of the council also lost his seat at the elections.

Ward results

Bedlinog

Cyfarthfa

The vote in the Cyfarthfa ward was delayed until June 8 because of the death of independent candidate, Ieuan Harris, during the campaign. The results gave the Independent group enough seats to have an overall majority on the council. Th current mayor, Margaret Davies, who'd won her seat at a November 2012 by-election, lost her seat.

Dowlais

Gurnos

Merthyr Vale

Park

Penydarren

Plymouth

Town

Treharris

Vaynor
 

* = sitting councillor in this ward prior to election

References

2017
Merthyr Tydfil